The following is a list of telenovelas produced by Televisa in the 2000s.

2000

2001

2002

2003

2004

2005

2006

2007

2008

2009

References 

Televisa 2000s
Mexican television-related lists
 2000s